Underwoodia is a genus of millipedes in the family Caseyidae. There are at least three described species in Underwoodia.

Species
These three species belong to the genus Underwoodia:
 Underwoodia iuloides (Harger, 1872) i c g b
 Underwoodia kurtschevae Golovatch, 1980 c g
 Underwoodia tida Chamberlin, 1925 i c g
Data sources: i = ITIS, c = Catalogue of Life, g = GBIF, b = Bugguide.net

References

Further reading

 
 

Chordeumatida
Articles created by Qbugbot
Millipede genera